Hans Tenggren (born 26 September 1949) is a Swedish racewalker. He competed in the men's 50 kilometres walk at the 1972 Summer Olympics.

References

1949 births
Living people
Athletes (track and field) at the 1972 Summer Olympics
Swedish male racewalkers
Olympic athletes of Sweden
Place of birth missing (living people)